Ñuñoa (from Mapudungun Ñuñohue, "place of yellow flowers") is a commune of the Northeastern zone of Santiago, in the Santiago Metropolitan Region of Chile. According to the 2021 Urban Life Quality Index (ICVU), it is considered the fourth best commune to live in the region and the country. The commune has undergone a significant population increase, from 163,511 inhabitants in 2002 to 208,237 in 2017, an increase of 27.3% in fifteen years, and an estimate in excess of 250,000 inhabitants in 2022. It is made up of medium and upper-middle socioeconomic groups. Recently, Ñuñoa's many charms and convenient location have led to an increase in desirability by young urban professionals to live there. In response, developers have bought out older homes and erected multi-dwelling units, a practice that has triggered much criticism from long-time residents.
The oldest municipality in the traditional east end of Santiago, Ñuñoa has most city amenities (subways, banks, shopping areas, etc.) while still maintaining its character as a quiet, mostly residential commune.

Ñuñoa boasts bustling public services and private businesses and a public transportation system serving all parts of the municipality.  Most business activity takes place along Irarrázaval Avenue, a 6-km thoroughfare crossing the entire municipality east-west, which is also supported by the Line 3 of the Santiago Metro. Ñuñoa is also home to Santiago’s only mosque, Chile’s largest sports complex and national stadium (Estadio Nacional), as well as two bohemian neighbourhoods; Plaza Ñuñoa and Barrio Italia, the latter shared with Providencia commune

Demographics
Per the 2002 census of the National Statistics Institute, Ñuñoa spans an area  in size and has 163,511 residents (73,215 male and 90,296 female), and the commune is a wholly urban area. The population dropped 5.3% (9,064 residents) from the 1992 to the 2002 censuses. The 2009 population was projected to be 149,205.

Stats
Average household income per capita: US$44,409 (PPP, 2006)
Population below poverty line: 4.3% (2006)
Regional quality of life index: 87.66, high, 1 out of 52 (2005)
Human Development Index: 0.860, 6 out of 341 (2003)

Notable residents

Soledad Alvear, senator
Gutenberg Martínez, politician
Jorge Arrate, politician
José Balmes, painter
Fanny Pollarolo, former deputy
Mercedes Valdivieso, writer
José Miguel Varas, journalist
Alvaro Diaz Arambulo, philosopher
Fernando Villegas, writer and political commentator
Alex Deferrari, musician
José Luis Rosasco, writer
Poli Delano, writer
Orlando Ezquerra, musician
Gerardo Parra, magus Oli

Administration
As a commune, Ñuñoa is a third-level administrative division of Chile run by a municipal council headed by a mayor elected to a four-year term of office. The mayor for 2016-2020 is Andrés Zarhi Troy (RN). The communal council has the following members:

Chile Vamos
 Guido Benavides Araneda (RN)
 José Luis Rosasco Zagal (RN)
 Juan Guillermo Vivado Portales (IND)
 Julio Martinez Colina (UDI)

Nueva Mayoría
 Jaime Castillo Soto (PDC)
 Paula Mendoza Bravo (PS)
 Patricia Hidalgo Jeldes (PPD)
 Alejandra Placencia Cabello (IND)

Frente Amplio
 Emilia Ríos Saavedra (RD)
 Camilo Brodsky Bertoni ((MA)

Ñuñoa and Providencia make up the 21st electoral district, currently represented in the Chamber of Deputies by Maya Fernández (PS) and Mayor Sabat's daughter, Marcela Sabat (RN). Ñuñoa is also part of the 8th senatorial constituency (Eastern Santiago), represented in the Senate by Carlos Montes (PS) and Manuel José Ossandón (RN).

Education

Private schools:
 Colegio Suizo de Santiago
 Kendal English School
 Colegio Akros
 Escuela Amaranta Gómez Regalado, founded in donated space in a community center.
 Colegio Francisco Encina
 Liceo Experimental Manuel de Salas
Public schools:

 Colegio República de Costa Rica

References

External links
  Municipality of Ñuñoa

Populated places in Santiago Province, Chile
Communes of Chile
Geography of Santiago, Chile
Populated places established in 1894